Fire with Fire is a 1986 American romantic drama film about a young woman from a Catholic boarding school who runs away with an escapee from a nearby prison camp. The film stars Virginia Madsen, Craig Sheffer, Jon Polito, Kate Reid, Kari Wuhrer, Tim Russ and D. B. Sweeney. It was directed by Duncan Gibbins, and features a soundtrack by Howard Shore.

Plot

Joe Fisk is a juvenile delinquent who falls in love with Lisa Taylor, a beautiful Catholic girls' school student, in an Oregon forest. The two meet by accident when Joe finds her being chased by his peers in a training exercise, and sees Lisa recreating the Pre-Raphaelite painting Ophelia by John Everett Millais by floating in the lake. Both of them are strongly drawn towards each other but as their current custodians discourage contact with the opposite sex they both find themselves in trouble. Forced to run away with each other, the young lovers hope to avoid the police and find happiness.

Cast 
 Craig Sheffer as Joe Fisk
 Virginia Madsen as Lisa Taylor
 Jon Polito as Mr. Duchard, The Boss
 J. J. Cohen as Myron, The Mapmaker
 Kate Reid as Sister Victoria
 Jean Smart as Sister Marie
 Tim Russ as Jerry Washington
 Kari Wuhrer as Gloria
 D. B. Sweeney as Thomas Baxter
 Ann Savage as Sister Harriet
 David Harris as Ben Halsey
 Dominick Brascia as Joey Burns

Reception 
Critics were generally negative at the time of the movie's release, saying the film was dull and slow-paced, and noted that the screenplay, credited to four writers, was poorly written.

Release 
It was released on VHS in 1986 by its own studio and on Blu-ray Disc and DVD on July 31, 2012, by Olive Films. , it is available through Amazon Video, iTunes Store and Vudu. The film was shot and produced under the original title Captive Hearts, but was changed to Fire with Fire just prior to the film's theatrical release. Due to the late change in title, press-kit stills are seen with the original title initials "CH", followed by a hyphen and the press still number, etched onto the film negatives and carried over onto the printed stills. The film’s new title was deemed more descriptive and exciting, as well as allowing a marketing tie-in with a song of the same title, "Fire with Fire" by the 1980s band Wild Blue.

External links

References 

1986 films
1986 romantic drama films
American romantic drama films
American teen romance films
Films about runaways
Films scored by Howard Shore
Films set in Oregon
Paramount Pictures films
1986 directorial debut films
Films with screenplays by Warren Skaaren
1980s English-language films
1980s American films